Lennartsson is a Swedish surname. Notable people with the surname include:

Benny Lennartsson (born 1942), Swedish football coach
Jan Lennartsson (born 1981), Swedish handball player
Jörgen Lennartsson (born 1965), Swedish football manager
Liselotta Lennartsson (born 1987), Swedish curler
Petter Lennartsson (born 1988), Swedish footballer
Tore Lennartsson, (born 1952), Swedish former footballer

See also
Lenartov

Swedish-language surnames
Patronymic surnames
Surnames from given names